Angelo Pedroni (born 6 October 1943) is an Italian sprint canoer who competed in the mid-1960s. He finished sixth in the K-4 1000 m event at the 1964 Summer Olympics in Tokyo.

References

1943 births
Canoeists at the 1964 Summer Olympics
Italian male canoeists
Living people
Olympic canoeists of Italy
20th-century Italian people